Michela Guzzetti (born 29 April 1992) is an Italian swimmer. She competed for Italy at the 2012 Summer Olympics.

References

Italian female breaststroke swimmers
Swimmers at the 2012 Summer Olympics
Olympic swimmers of Italy
1992 births
Living people
Swimmers at the 2013 Mediterranean Games
Mediterranean Games competitors for Italy
21st-century Italian women